Corporate Environmental Responsibility (CER) refers to a company's duties to abstain from damaging natural environments. The term derives from corporate social responsibility (CSR).

Background
The environmental aspect of CSR has been debated over the past few decades, as stakeholders increasingly require organizations to become more environmentally aware and socially responsible. In the traditional business model, environmental protection was considered only in relation to the "public interest". Hitherto, governments had maintained principal responsibility for ensuring environmental management and conservation.

The public sector has been focused on the development of regulations and the imposition of sanctions as a means to facilitating environmental protection. Recently, the private sector has adopted the approach of co-responsibility towards the prevention and alleviation of environmental damage. The sectors and their roles have been changing, with the private sector becoming more active in the protection of the environment. Many governments, corporations, and big companies are now providing strategies for environmental protection and economic growth.

The World Commission on Environment published the Brundtland Report in 1987 to address sustainable development. Since then, managers, scholars, and business owners have tried to determine why and how big corporations should incorporate environmental aspects into their own policies. In recent years, an increasing number of companies have pledged to protect natural environments.

Relations to corporate social responsibility
There are different perceptions of CSR between government, the private sector, non-governmental organizations (NGOs) and society in general, and thus, the concept has no single definition.

CSR may cover: 

 a company running its business responsibly in relation to internal stakeholders (shareholders, employees, customers and suppliers);
 the role of business in relation to the state (locally and nationally) as well as to inter-state institutions or standards; and 
 business performance as a responsible member of the society in which it operates and the global community."

The European Union defines CSR as "...the concept that an enterprise is accountable for its impact on all relevant stakeholders. It is the continuing commitment by a business to behave fairly and responsibly and contribute to economic development while
improving the quality of life of the workforce and their families as well as of the local community and society at large." According to this definition, a CSR strategy is more focused on social aspects, particularly the interests of stakeholders.

CER is, in many ways, connected to CSR, as both of them influence environmental protection. CER, however, is strictly about the consideration of environmental implications and protection within corporate strategy. The understanding of CER cannot be separated from CSR—both are interconnected and based on environmental protection. There are three major areas related to these two concepts—economic, environmental and social. CER is focused more on economic and environmental while CSR relates to social and environmental aspects. Economy, society, and environment all play significant roles in the development of an efficient and effective company strategy.

Main elements
These cover the environmental implications of a company's operations:
 Eliminate waste and emissions
 Maximize the efficient use of resources and productivity
 Minimize activities that might impair the enjoyment of resources by future generations.

Drivers and challenges
Among the main drivers for CER are government policies and regulations. Many states provide their own legislation, regulations and policies, which are important in creating a positive environmental attitude within companies. Subsidies, tariffs and taxes play a vital role in the implementation of these policies.
Another significant factor is the competitive environment among companies generated by media, public, shareholder and NGO awareness, which are also major drivers of CER.
Another significant driver of corporate responsibility is that the private sector is largely responsible for the development of green technology and renewable energy sources meaning they are contributing towards climate change mitigation while still operating as a business.

Challenges include the cost of regulation and difficulties in predicting economic gains, which could become problematic for a company's management. Additionally, new technologies are frequently too expensive for a lot of companies.
Another challenge is the lack of harmonization of regulations among different states—often there is a mosaic of propositions, leading to unclear strategies for environmental behavior, especially in multinational corporations.
Further challenges of CES are whether corporations have a responsibility to go further than the current governmental legislation and Corporation a firstly responsible to produce profit for shareholders and producing goods for customers.
Furthermore Companies work within the framework of the society and country that they operate in menaing that corporations cannot be held solely responsible for lack of legislation on pollution and emissions.
Corporations emissions are also fractured between different sectors such as supply and outsourcing which can make it unclear what emissions the corporation is responsible.
Further challenges is the argument of whether corporations should be held responsible for past emissions when the negative impacts were not known.

Worldwide Perspectives on Corporate Environmental Responsibility 
The majority of international CSR studies focus on business practices and its aspects, such as business economics and the legality of environmental law. Most companies are noticing the importance of taking into account one of its most important stakeholders: employees and customers and their commitment to sustainability. Studies have demonstrated that once companies place sustainability practices they can be directly linked to financial success and customer satisfaction, which in turn can be used as a marketing tool. Although every country has a different culture, and each country determines their own scale of environmental responsibility, research has shown that there is a standard global human values that drive customer needs and wants. Companies have taken initiatives to take sustainability and align it with each company's economic goals. Managers and other people at the top, play the key role in decision-making and implementing the firm's sustainability practices.

Benefits of Corporate Environmental Responsibility 
Corporate social responsibility can prove to be more profitable for companies and to extend it survivability in markets because greater awareness on this topic, in both social and business markets, has been in higher demand. Customers have responded with overall satisfaction and loyalty when companies have a better CSR, especially in countries like Spain and Brazil. Culture has an impact on the CSR ratings and studies, as well as human values across different nations.

This topic can also be found under sustainable development. This area is concerned with not only protecting the environment but maintaining economical growth. There were several agreements internationally to help adopt new business practices that held these standards, but they were considered individual and there was no law-abiding body to regulate nor implement them.

One of the other factors that is considered an integral part of sustainable development are human beings, and specific groups and their habitat. Counties and companies that more developed would lead, and other small countries and business would slowly make gains. It is important to recognize that just because corporate environmental responsibility is being recognized that consumption is something that is not discouraged.

The idea of corporate environmental responsibility (CER) is for humans to be more aware of the environmental impact and counteract their pollution/carbon footprint on the natural resources. One of the main factors is to reduce carbon footprint and carbon emissions. Many of the studies focus on trying to find a balance between economic growth and reducing waste and cleaner environments.

Furthermore, many firms are discovering that there is an advantage to advocating for environmental regulations and preparing for them to be implemented before they become law. In a recent study, the researcher found that firms support climate change legislation as a means of gaining power over their competitors. Essentially, even if a new regulation hurts a firm in the short term, the firm may embrace it because they know that it will hurt their competitors even more. This allows them to come out on top in the long run.

Summary
The environmental aspects of security have increasingly become a major issue being considered by states. The process of securitization has had a big impact in creating a new understanding of security.
Globalization also plays a key role in the adoption of new environmental strategies as a multi-faceted process influencing modern societies, and creating interconnected and multidimensional environments.

CER is used by multinational corporations as well as small, local organizations. It is highlighted and more institutionalized because of stakeholders' awareness of the huge impacts of business activities on the environment. To understand CER, its relations with CSR strategies need to be recognized. CER and CSR are the main strategies that help in the creation of efficient and environmentally sustainable businesses.

See also
Triple bottom line

References

Corporate social responsibility
Environmental protection